Immigration detention is the policy of holding individuals suspected of visa violations, illegal entry or unauthorized arrival, as well as those subject to deportation and removal until a decision is made by immigration authorities to grant a visa and release them into the community, or to repatriate them to their country of departure.  Mandatory detention refers to the practice of compulsorily detaining or imprisoning people seeking political asylum, or who are considered to be illegal immigrants or unauthorized arrivals into a country. Some countries have set a maximum period of detention, while others permit indefinite detention.

Americas

United States 

In the United States, a similar practice began in the early 1980s with Haitians and Cubans detained at Guantanamo Bay, and other groups such as Chinese in jails and detention centres on the mainland. The practice was made mandatory by legislation passed in 1996 in response to the Oklahoma City bombing, and has come under criticism from organizations such as Amnesty International, Human Rights Watch, Human Rights First, all of whom have released major studies of the subject, and the ACLU. As of 2010, about 31,000 non-citizens were held in immigration detention on any given day, including children, in over 200 detention centres, jails, and prisons nationwide.

The T. Don Hutto Residential Center opened in 2006 specifically to house non-criminal families. There are other significant facilities in Elizabeth, New Jersey, Oakdale, Louisiana, Florence, Arizona, Miami, Florida, Seattle, York, Pennsylvania, Batavia, New York, Aguadilla, Puerto Rico, and all along the Texas–Mexico border.

During the five years between 2003 and 2008, about 104 mostly young individuals died in detention of the U. S. Immigration and Customs Enforcement (ICE) or shortly afterwards, and medical neglect may have contributed to 30 of those deaths. For example, on 6 August 2008, 34-year-old New Yorker Hiu Lui Ng died in the detention of ICE. Editors at The New York Times condemned the death and urged that the system must be fixed. ICE has stated that the number of deaths per capita in detention is dramatically lower for ICE detainees than for U.S. prison and jail populations, that they provide "the best possible healthcare" and that the nation as a whole is "experiencing severe shortages of qualified health professionals." In May 2008 Congress began considering a bill to set new standards for immigrant detainee healthcare.

In 2009, the Obama Administration pledged to overhaul the current immigration detention system and transform it into one that is less punitive and subject to greater federal oversight. Immigrants' rights advocates expressed concern over Obama's reform efforts. Immigrants' rights advocates believe the all current immigration policies "have been undermined by the Immigration agency’s continued overreliance on penal incarceration practices and by the pervasive anti-reform culture at local ICE field offices."

Canada 

Immigration detainees may also be kept in provincial jails, either because the IHCs are full, there is no centres in their region, or the detainee's file has a link to criminality.

As of 2020, Canada has three IHCs, each facility with different ownership and operations:
 Laval IHC (Laval, Quebec): Opened in 1999, the Laval IHC operates under a Memorandum of Understanding between CBSA and the Correctional Services of Canada, the latter of whom owns the facility.
 Greater Toronto Area IHC (Toronto, Ontario): Opened in 2003, GTA IHC is provided to the CBSA under a third-party service contract with a vendor.
 British Columbia IHC (Surrey, British Columbia): Opened in 2020, BC IHC facility is owned by the CBSA.

There is no maximum limit to the length of detention, and children may be "housed" in IHCs to prevent the separation of families.  Detainees can include: asylum seekers without sufficient amount of necessary identification papers, foreign workers whose visas had expired, and people awaiting deportation. In 2017, Canada received the highest number of asylum claims in its history; between 2017 and 2018, 6609 people were detained in holding centres, compared to 4,248 a year prior.

Between April 2019 and March 2020, CBSA detained 8,825 people, including 138 minors (mostly with a detained parent)—almost 2,000 of these detainees were kept in provincial jails. However, as of November 2020, in the midst of the COVID-19 pandemic, there were only 94 immigration detainees in provincial jails, 12 in Laval IHC, 18 in Greater Toronto IHC, and 11 in British Columbia IHC.

Asia-Pacific
Most Asian states imprison immigrants on visa violations or for alleged trafficking, including the victims of trafficking and smuggling. These include Singapore, Malaysia, and Indonesia.

Australia

In Australia, mandatory immigration detention was adopted in 1992 for all non-citizens who arrive in Australia without a visa. That only 'border applicants' are subject to detention has sparked criticism, as it is claimed to unfairly discriminate against certain migrants. Other unlawful non-citizens, such as those that overstay their visas, are generally granted bridging visas while their applications are processed, and are therefore free to move around the community. The long-term detention of immigrant children has also sparked criticism of the practice by citizen's groups such as ChilOut and human rights organizations. Nonetheless, the High Court of Australia has confirmed, by the majority, the constitutionality of indefinite mandatory detention of aliens. This and related decisions have been the subject of considerable academic critique.

Australia has also sub-contracted with other nations to detain would-be immigrants offshore, including Indonesia, Papua New Guinea, and Nauru.  Australia also maintains an offshore detention facility on Christmas Island. In July 2008, the Australian government announced it was ending its policy of automatic detention for asylum seekers who arrive in the country without visas. However, by September 2012, offshore detention was reinstated. Following the 2013 Australian federal election policies have been toughened and Operation Sovereign Borders has been launched.

India
The first immigration detention centre in Assam state had come up in 2008 when the Indian National Congress (INC) government was in power. In 2011 the Congress government set up three more camps. In 2018 and onwards the Bharatiya Janta Party (BJP) government has plans to build more camps across India.

Japan
Japanese immigration law permits indefinite detention without a court order including for those that overstay and those who seek asylum. Three immigration detention centers are maintained by immigration bureau for long-term detainees:

Higashi Nihon Nyukoku Kanri Center (Ushiku, Ibaraki, East Japan) – capacity: 700
Nishi Nihon Nyukoku Kanri Center (Ibaraki, Osaka, West Japan)
Omura Nyukoku Kanri Center (Omura, Nagasaki) – capacity: 800
Additionally, 16 regional detention houses are managed for short-term detention.  However, many of the long-term detainees have been detained in regional short-term detention houses that lack facilities such as common rooms and recreational area. Some detainees spend significant time (up to 13 days) in isolation due to disciplinary measures. Practices of immigration bureau has been criticized for the "lack of transparency", "indefinite detention" and its "arbitrary" nature.

Europe

Greece 
In late 2019, Greece's liberal-conservative government of New Democracy, led by Kyriakos Mitsotakis, announced the creation of five closed, pre-departure detention centers for refugees and immigrants, located on the Aegean islands of Leros, Chios, Lesvos, Kos, and Samos. Hosting over 20,000 immigrants, the islands will be compensated with a 30% VAT reduction. Ten other closed detention camps were planned as of 2019.

Italy 
Since 6 March 1998 (law n.40/1998, aka the Turco-Napolitano law), the irregular immigrants whose asylum request had been denied were interned into "Provisional Stay Centers" (CPT), pending their expulsion from Italy.

Since 30 July 2002, the Bossi-Fini law (law n. 189/2002) made illegal entry and stay on Italian territory a criminal offence. Centers interned both people already sanctioned to expulsion (as before) and other irregular immigrants pending their proper identification and the individual evaluation of their asylum requests. Accordingly, since 23 May 2008 (law n.125/2008), they were renamed as "Identification and Expulsion Centers" (CIE).

Since 13 April 2017, the Minniti-Orlando (law n. 46/2017) renamed the centers again, as "Permanence Centers for Repatriations" (CPR). It was planned to activate 20 CPRs, but by 2018, only the following CPRs were operational:

Roma, for 125 female inmates.
Bari, for 90 male inmates.
Brindisi, for 48 male inmates.
Torino, for 175 male inmates.
Potenza, for 100 male inmates.

The facility of Caltanissetta (for 96 male inmates) was provisionally inoperative, pending extensive repairs after an inmates revolt. Works were undergoing to open further CPRs at Gradisca d'Isonzo, Modena, Macomer, Oppido Mamertina and Montichiari.

Besides the CPRs, in Italy there are two other types of not-detention centers for the migrants:

 "First Aid and Reception Centers" (CPSA), short-stay centers handling first medical aid and health screening of the incoming migrants, their first identification and the reception of the asylum requests. By 2018 the operational CPSA were located at Lampedusa, Elmas, Otranto and Pozzallo.
 "Reception Centers for Asylum Seekers" (CARA), were are housed the vast majority of the incoming migrants that due to the limited overall capacity cannot be detained in the CPRs, or the migrants previously detained in the CPRs that have not been repatriated within the statutory maximum detention period and have therefore been released from custody. By the 2018 the operational CARA were located at Gradisca d'Isonzo, Arcevia, Castelnuovo di Porto, Manfredonia, Bari, Brindisi, Crotone, Mineo, Pozzallo, Caltanissetta, Lampedusa, Trapani and Elmas. It has been reported by several NGOs and government organizations that the condition inside the chronically overcrowded CARA centres are often "inhuman". Amnesty International denounced that the immigrants are often placed in containers and in other types of inadequate housing in an extended stay, exposed to extreme temperatures, under conditions of overcrowding.

Malta 

In 2002 and the following years, Malta began to receive a large influx of migrants. The government then begun to apply the 1970 Chapter 217 of the Laws of Malta (Immigration Act), providing for detention for all "prohibited migrants", including prospective asylum seekers, soon after apprehension by the immigration authorities. In 2003, the Maltese government substituted the indefinite detention policy with an 18-month detention length (the maximum under EU law) after which the applicant is transferred to an open centre if the processing of his/her application has not been finished.

The Maltese detention policy, the strictest in Europe, gathered heavy criticism by the UNHCR for the extensive duration of detention, and in 2004 it was also criticized by the Commissioner for Human Rights of Council of Europe, Álvaro Gil-Robles, as international standards required cautious and individual examination of each case and proper legal checks before incarceration, which were missing in the Maltese legislation. The Council of Europe also criticised four of the administrative detention centres as in "deplorable conditions" and failing to live up to legally binding international standards

The Ministry for Justice and Home Affairs pursued the migrants detention policy nevertheless, justifying it in 2005 by "national interest, and more specifically, for reasons concerning employment, accommodation and maintenance of public order." In 2008, an EP-OIM comparative study found that "following a long stay in detention [illegal immigrants] are then released into the community...joining the black market economy and suffering abuse with regard to conditions of work.

The detention policy was criticised, in the following years, by NGOs and international bodies, including Human Rights Watch, the Jesuits and UNHCR. In 2012, the Council of Europe reiterated that such a policy is contrary to the prohibition of arbitrary detention in the European Convention on Human Rights (ECHR).

Netherlands 

In the Netherlands, foreigners who fail to obtain a residence status can be detained prior to deportation, as to prevent them from avoiding deportation. Detention centers are located in Zaandam, Zeist, and Alphen aan den Rijn. Besides these detention centers there are deportation centers in Schiphol and Rotterdam (at Rotterdam Airport).

Immigration detention in the Netherlands is criticised for the circumstances immigrants are held in, which is often worse than that of criminal detainees, especially because of the lack of probationary leave, rehabilitation assistance, legal assistance, laws restricting the maximum detention time and a maximum time for judicial review from a judge.

Portugal
In Portugal, the Ministry of Interior is responsible for immigration matters. The country currently has one officially designated immigration detention centre, Unidade Habitacional de Santo António, located in Porto. Opened in 2006, the centre is managed by the Foreigners and Borders Service (SEF).

There are also five Temporary Installation Centres (CIT) located in each major airport, including that of Porto, Lisbon, Faro, Funchal, and Ponta Delgada. Besides this government-led places, in Lisbon there is the Bobadela reception centre for asylum seekers run by the Portuguese Council for Asylum Seekers (CPR) and the Pedro Arupe reception centre managed by the Jesuit Refugee Service.

Spain
There are nine detention centers in Spain, known as CIEs, run by the Ministry of the Interior, which can be found in the cities of Madrid, Barcelona, Valencia, Algeciras, Tariff, Malaga, Gran Canaria, Fuerteventura, and Tenerife.

Expulsion paperwork can be initiated when a foreign person is in one of the following situations:

 Lacking documentation in Spanish territory.
 Working without a work permit, even if they have a valid resident permit.
 Be involved in activities that violate public order or interior or exterior state security or any activity contrary to Spanish interests or that could put in danger Spain's relations with other countries.
 Be convicted inside or outside of Spain of a crime punishable by incarceration for greater than one year.
 Hiding or falsifying their situation from the Ministry of the Interior.
 Lacking a legal livelihood or taking part in illegal activity.

Various civil organizations (e.g. , SOS Racismo, and Andalucía Acoge) have appealed to the Supreme Court of Spain, declaring the regulations behind the CIEs null and void for violating several human rights.

Ukraine
In Ukraine "Temporary Detention Centres", including one in Pavshyno, are run by the State Border Guard Service of Ukraine, responsible to the President.

United Kingdom

The British Home Office has a number of detention centres, including: 11 designated Immigration Removal Centres (IRCs), 4 designated Residential and Short Term Holding Facilities, and 1 Non-Residential Short Term Holding Facility. Four of the IRCs are managed by the Prison Service and the others are outsourced to private companies including Mitie, GEO Group, G4S Group, and Serco. Individuals can be detained under Immigration Act powers for a number of reasons. The largest category of detainees is people who have claimed asylum. Other people include those detained awaiting determination of their right to entry to the UK, people who have been refused permission to enter and are awaiting removal, people who have overstayed the expiry of their visas or have not complied with their visa terms, and people lacking the required documentation to live in the UK.

The Nationality, Immigration and Asylum Act 2002 formally changed the name of "detention centres" to "removal centres".

Both operation centres ran by G4S Group (as of 2018) are located near Gatwick Airport:

Brook House Immigration Removal Centre
Tinsley House Immigration Removal Centre

Operation centres ran by Mitie (as of 2018) include:

Campsfield House (Oxfordshire)
Colnbrook Immigration Removal Centre (near Heathrow Airport)
Harmondsworth Immigration Removal Centre (near Heathrow Airport)

Other operation centres (as of 2018) include:

 Larne House (Larne, Antrim), run by Tascor, a subsidiary of Capita
Pennine House, at Manchester Airport which is run by Tascor
Dungavel (Lanarkshire), run by GEO Group
Morton Hall Immigration Removal Centre (near Newark), run by Her Majesty's Prison Service
Yarl's Wood Immigration Removal Centre (Bedfordshire), run by Serco

Additionally, some prisons detain migrants or asylum seekers purely under Immigration Act powers, usually if they have been serving a prison sentence which has expired. There are also four short term holding facilities in Manchester, Dover, Harwich and Colnbrook.

The British government has been given powers to detain asylum seekers and migrants at any stage of the asylum process. The use of asylum has increased with the introduction of the process of 'fast track', or the procedure by which the Immigration Service assess asylum claims which are capable of being decided quickly. Fast-tracking takes place in Oakington Reception Centre, Harmondsworth, and Yarl's Wood.

There are three situations in which it is lawful to detain an asylum seeker or migrant.

 To fast track their claim
 If the government has reasonable grounds to believe that the asylum seeker or migrant will abscond or not abide by the conditions of entry.
 If the asylum seeker or migrant is about to be deported.

Once detained, it is possible to apply for bail. There is legal aid for representation at bail hearings and the organisation Bail for Immigration Detainees provides help and assistance for those subject to detention to represent themselves.

Since summer 2005, there has been an increase in the detention of foreign nationals since Home Secretary Charles Clarke's foreign prisoners scandal, which revealed that there were a number of foreign nationals who had committed crimes and had not been deported at the end of their sentence.

Criticism of U.K. immigration detention focuses on comparisons with prison conditions in which persons are kept though they have never been convicted of a crime, the lack of judicial oversight, and on the lengthy bureaucratic delays that often prevent a person from being released, particularly when there is no evidence that the detainee will present a harm or a burden to society if allowed to remain at large while their situation is examined. In 2006, the conditions of detention centres were criticised, by the U.K. Inspector of Prisons.

See also

 Immigration detention in the United States
 Immigration detention in the United Kingdom
 Concentration camps
Decarceration in the United States
 Dawn raid
 Golden Venture
 Mandatory sentencing
 Mariel boatlift
 Pacific Solution

References

Citations

Notes

Further reading
 Austin, Janet, ed. 2003. From Nothing to Zero: Letters from Refugees in Australia's Detention Centres. Melbourne: Lonely Planet.
Bernstein, Nina. 2010 March 29. "Disabled Immigration Detainees Face Deportation." New York Times.
Dow, Mark. 2005. American Gulag: Inside U.S. Immigration Prisons. University of California Press. , .
Kalhan, Anil. 2010. "Rethinking Immigration Detention." Columbia Law Review Sidebar (110):42–42. . Archived.
Mares, Peter. 2001. Borderline. Sydney: University of New South Wales Press.
 "Immigrant Families Behind Bars ." Making Contact Radio. 2009 October 21.

External links 
 Global Detention Project: Mapping the use of detention

Criminal law
Imprisonment and detention
Immigration law
International law
Detention centers
Immigration detention centers and prisons